Pixie Queen is the fourth studio album by Circa Survive's lead vocalist, Anthony Green. It was released on September 9, 2016. The first single, "You'll Be Fine", was released under Will Yip's label, Memory Music (An imprint of Run For Cover Records). The whole album was streamed on August 31, 2016.

Track listing

Charts

References

2016 albums
Anthony Green (musician) albums
Albums produced by Will Yip